Mark Selden (born 1938) is a coordinator of the open-access journal The Asia-Pacific Journal: Japan Focus, a senior research associate in the East Asia Program at Cornell University, and Bartle Professor of History and Sociology at Binghamton University. He graduated from Amherst College with a major in American Studies and completed a Ph.D. at Yale University in modern Chinese history. He was a founding member of the Committee of Concerned Asian Scholars in the 1960s and for more than thirty years served on the board of editors of The Bulletin of Concerned Asian Scholars (later Critical Asian Studies). He is also the editor of book series at Rowman & Littlefield, Routledge, and M.E. Sharpe publishers.

Bibliography
A specialist on the modern and contemporary geopolitics, political economy and history of China, Japan and the Asia Pacific, his work has addressed themes of war and revolution, inequality, development, regional and world social change, and historical memory.  

Selden's works include:

 Chinese Society: Change, Conflict and Resistance co-edited with Elizabeth J. Perry, 2009 (3rd edition).
 War and State Terrorism: The United States, Japan, and the Asia-Pacific in the Long Twentieth Century co-authored with Alvin Y. So, 2003.
 The Resurgence of East Asia: 500, 150 and 50 Year Perspectives] co-edited with Giovanni Arrighi and Takeshi Hamashita, 2003.
 Censoring History: Citizenship and Memory in Japan, China and the United States co-edited with Laura Hein, 2000. 
 The Atomic Bomb: Voices From Hiroshima and Nagasaki Co-edited with Kyoko Selden and Robert J. Lifton, 1997.
 China in Revolution: The Yenan Way Revisited, 1995 (2nd edition), 
 Chinese Village: Socialist State co-authored with Edward Friedman and Paul Pickowicz, 1993. . Winner of the Joseph Levenson Book Prize for 1993.
 The Yenan Way in Revolutionary China, 1971.

Personal life
Mark Selden was married to Japanese-born scholar Kyoko Iriye Selden (1936-2013) until her death. They had three children.

References

External links
Personal Homepage

Living people
Cornell University faculty
Binghamton University faculty
Yale University alumni
1938 births